Chase High School may refer to:

United States
 Chase High School (Kansas), Chase, Kansas
 Chase High School (North Carolina), Forest City, North Carolina
 Chase County Junior/Senior High School, Cottonwood Falls, Kansas
 Chase County High School (Nebraska), Imperial, Nebraska
 Bethesda-Chevy Chase High School, Bethesda, Maryland

England
 Chase High School, Westcliff-on-Sea, Essex
 The Chase School, Malvern, Worcestershire